A mí me gusta (I like it) is an album released in 1993 by Los del Río.

Track listing

International version

Colombian version (BMG Ariola de Colombia)

Chart performance

References
 [ Billboard Album info]

1993 albums